Concord Township is a township in Butler County, Pennsylvania, United States. The population was 1,505 at the 2010 census.

Geography
Concord Township is located northeast of the center of Butler County and contains the unincorporated communities of Hooker and Greece City.

Demographics

As of the census of 2000, there were 1,493 people, 569 households, and 425 families living in the township.  The population density was 60.0 people per square mile (23.2/km2).  There were 602 housing units at an average density of 24.2/sq mi (9.3/km2).  The racial makeup of the township was 99.3% White, 0.1% African American, and 0.6% from two or more races.

There were 569 households, out of which 32.7% had children under the age of 18 living with them, 62.9% were married couples living together, 7.7% had a female householder with no husband present, and 25.3% were non-families. 20.7% of all households were made up of individuals, and 7.0% had someone living alone who was 65 years of age or older.  The average household size was 2.60 and the average family size was 3.03.

In the township the population was spread out, with 24.6% under the age of 18, 8.8% from 18 to 24, 31.2% from 25 to 44, 25.0% from 45 to 64, and 10.3% who were 65 years of age or older.  The median age was 37 years. For every 100 females there were 97.0 males.  For every 100 females age 18 and over, there were 99.1 males.

The median income for a household in the township was $40,134, and the median income for a family was $44,107. Males had a median income of $30,882 versus $23,250 for females. The per capita income for the township was $18,762.  About 7.7% of families and 11.4% of the population were below the poverty line, including 16.3% of those under age 18 and 11.2% of those age 65 or over.

References

Populated places established in 1796
Townships in Butler County, Pennsylvania
1796 establishments in Pennsylvania